Black mold or black mould may refer to:

 Black mold (Stachybotrys chartarum), common in water-damaged buildings
 Black mold (Aspergillus niger), the most common species of the genus Aspergillus
 Black bread mold (Rhizopus stolonifer), a widely distributed thread-like mucoralean mold commonly found on bread surfaces
 Black Mold, the alias used by Canadian musician Chad VanGaalen for his 2009 album Snow Blindness Is Crystal Antz
 "Black Mold", the debut single from the Jon Spencer Blues Explosion's 2012 album Meat + Bone
Black Mould, a comic series in the Rivers of London universe

See also
 Mold (fungus)